Indocumentado (Undocumented) (1992) is the ninth studio album by Mexican rock and blues band El Tri.

The name of the album comes for the main single, "Indocumentado" is the common word for a Mexican person or any other nationality that find its way into the US without the proper documentation; The song is a tale of the physical and emotional hardships the "Indocumentado" goes through.

Track listing 
All tracks by Alex Lora except where noted.

 "El Dragón" (The Dragon) – 3:48
 "Cuando Canta el Grillo" (When The Cricket Sings) (Lora, Rafael Salgado) – 4:09
 "Indocumentado" (Undocumented) – 4:19
 "No Vuelvo a Agarrar la Jarra" (I Won't Take The Jar Again) – 2:44 
 "Nadie Sabe Para Quién Trabaja" (No One Knows Who They Work For) (Lora, Pedro Martinez) – 3:42
 "Valle de Lágrimas" (Valley Of Tears) – 2:57
 "Tirando a Matar" (Shoot To Kill) – 3:35
 "Así Se Hacen los Chismes" (That's How Gossip Is Born) – 4:04
 "El Blues de la Navidad" (Christmas Blues) – 3:39
 "Igual Pa' Todos" (The Same For Everyone) – 4:48

Personnel 
 Alex Lora – guitar, arranger, vocals, producer, mixing, artistic producer
 Rafael Salgado – harmonic
 Felipe Souza – electric & rhythm guitar
 Eduardo Chico – guitar
 Pedro Martínez – drums, backing vocals
 Ruben Soriano – bass
 Chela DeLora – backing vocals, Coordination

Guest musicians 
Carolyn Asplin – violin on "Tirando a matar"
Victor Anderson – brass instrument
Victor Cisneros – Tenor Sax

Technical 
Pancho Gilardi – photography
Bernie Grundman – mastering
Michael Hoffman – coordination, art coordinator
Chuck Johnson – mixing, mixing assistant
Richard Kaplan – engineer, mixing

External links
www.eltri.com.mx
Indocumentado at MusicBrainz
[ Indocumentado] at AllMusic

El Tri albums
1992 albums
Warner Music Group albums